Sławomir Majusiak (30 May 1964 – 5 December 2021) was a Polish long-distance runner who competed mainly in track running. His greatest achievement was a 5000 metres bronze medal at the 1990 European Athletics Championships. He also represented Poland at the 1989 IAAF World Cross Country Championships and 1991 World Championships in Athletics.

Majusiak was born in Jarocin, Poland. As a young athlete he was a 3000 metres bronze medallist at the 1983 European Athletics Junior Championships, becoming the first Pole to reach the podium in that event. He won the 5000 m at the European Cup B Final.

Despite his international success, he only won one title in his career at the Polish Athletics Championships, topping the podium in the 10,000 metres in 1990. He was also the winner at the Polish Cross Country Championships in 1989 and 1990.

He trained with fellow Polish European medallist Bogusław Mamiński, with a focus on the fartlek method. He retired before the age of thirty due to poor mental health. After athletics he went into business, working at a drinks company with his brothers before moving into real estate.

Personal bests
3000 metres – 7:51.58 mins (1990)
5000 metres – 13:22.92 mins (1990)
10,000 metres – 28:11.50 mins (1990)

All information from All-Athletics.

International competitions

National titles
Polish Athletics Championships
10,000 m: 1990
Polish Cross Country Championships
Long race: 1989, 1990

See also
List of European Athletics Championships medalists (men)

References

External links



1964 births
2021 deaths
People from Jarocin
Polish male long-distance runners
European Athletics Championships medalists
World Athletics Championships athletes for Poland
Sportspeople from Greater Poland Voivodeship